Zhongjiang County is a county of Sichuan Province, China. It is under the administration of the prefecture-level city of Deyang.

Climate

References

External links

County-level divisions of Sichuan
Deyang